Porewa railway station was a station on the North Island Main Trunk in New Zealand located in Pohonui-Porewa, on the Hunterville Branch (later incorporated into the NIMT),  from Marton. The station was in use from 1887 to 1982, but now has only a single track through the site.

History 

The line was inspected in 1884. The official opening of the  Marton to Hunterville section was on Saturday 2 June 1888, when the station was served by two trains a week. A Certificate of Inspection for the line was issued on Wednesday, 6 June 1888. By 1894 the branch had two trains a day.

Gifford & O'Connor built the station in 1887, its final certificate being given on 6 January 1888. By 1896 Porewa had a shelter shed, platform, cart approach, loading bank, urinals and a passing loop for 27 wagons, extended to 76 by 1980. Cattle yards were added in 1888. After flooding, it was recommended in 1897 that the ganger's house be moved to higher ground. In 1978 the railway housing was given up. A tablet porter started in 1912, who could help with goods traffic. The sidings were improved in 1914. Electric lighting came in 1939. In 1980 only a loading bank was noted. On Sunday, 25 April 1982 Porewa closed to all traffic.

New passing loop 
From 14 December 1983 a new crossing loop replaced those at Rata and Porewa,  to the east of Porewa. Porewa is the official name, for the new crossing loop. The correct name for the nearby Porewa Stream is Pourewa. There is a shelter at the new loop. The realignment of State Highway 1 alongside the railway occurred between the map editions of 1986 and 2009.

References

External links 

 Video of train heading south at Porewa Rd crossing in 2013

Defunct railway stations in New Zealand
Railway stations opened in 1887
1887 establishments in New Zealand
Railway stations closed in 1982
1982 disestablishments in New Zealand